Engineer-in-Chief (Bangladesh army)
 Engineer-in-Chief (Pakistan Army)

See also

 Chief Royal Engineer